The 1985 McNeese State Cowboys football team was an American football team that represented McNeese State University as a member of the Southland Conference (Southland) during the 1985 NCAA Division I-AA football season. In their third year under head coach John McCann, the team compiled an overall record of 6–3–2, with a mark of 3–1–2 in conference play, and finished third in the Southland.

Schedule

References

McNeese State
McNeese Cowboys football seasons
McNeese State Cowboys football